Sharpsburg is a city in Taylor County, Iowa, United States. The population was 72 at the time of the 2020 census. 

Sharpsburg was founded in 1884 as a stop on the Chicago, Burlington and Quincy Railroad.  A post office was established in 1886, and the city was incorporated in 1905.

Geography
Sharpsburg is located at  (40.802120, -94.640352).

Demographics

2010 census
As of the census of 2010, there were 89 people, 35 households, and 22 families residing in the city. The racial makeup of the city was 98.9% White and 1.1% from two or more races. Hispanic or Latino of any race were 5.6% of the population.

There were 35 households, of which 28.6% had children under the age of 18 living with them, 48.6% were married couples living together, 8.6% had a female householder with no husband present, 5.7% had a male householder with no wife present, and 37.1% were non-families. 34.3% of all households were made up of individuals, and 14.3% had someone living alone who was 65 years of age or older. The average household size was 2.54 and the average family size was 3.23.

The median age in the city was 38.5 years. 25.8% of residents were under the age of 18; 12.4% were between the ages of 18 and 24; 24.6% were from 25 to 44; 16.8% were from 45 to 64; and 20.2% were 65 years of age or older. The gender makeup of the city was 56.2% male and 43.8% female.

2000 census
As of the census of 2000, there were 98 people, 39 households, and 26 families residing in the city. The racial makeup of the city was 94.90% White, 4.08% Asian, and 1.02% from two or more races.

There were 39 households, out of which 30.8% had children under the age of 18 living with them, 56.4% were married couples living together, 7.7% had a female householder with no husband present, and 33.3% were non-families. 30.8% of all households were made up of individuals, and 17.9% had someone living alone who was 65 years of age or older. The average household size was 2.51 and the average family size was 3.19.

In the city, the population was spread out, with 29.6% under the age of 18, 6.1% from 18 to 24, 20.4% from 25 to 44, 26.5% from 45 to 64, and 17.3% who were 65 years of age or older. The median age was 40 years. For every 100 females, there were 81.5 males. For every 100 females age 18 and over, there were 76.9 males.

The median income for a household in the city was $26,042, and the median income for a family was $28,125. Males had a median income of $20,625 versus $12,083 for females. The per capita income for the city was $8,779. There were 7.4% of families and 14.4% of the population living below the poverty line, including 8.6% of under eighteens and 15.4% of those over 64.

Education
Sharpsburg is a part of the Lenox Community School District.

References

Cities in Taylor County, Iowa
Cities in Iowa
1884 establishments in Iowa